Cam Tatham, known by his stage name Sleepy Tom, is a Canadian DJ and music producer. He released his first EP The Currency on Fool's Gold Records in March 2013. The music video for lead track, "The Currency", debuted on Rolling Stone's website. In August 2014, he played at the fifth annual Squamish Valley Music Festival. The Vancouver-based producer and DJ went on to remix tracks for some of the heavier hitters of the EDM scene at that time, like Zeds Dead, Martin Solveig, and Diplo, who collaborated with Sleepy Tom to score the Platinum certified UK hit "Be Right There" in 2015.

Discography

Extended plays 
 The Currency (2013)
 Amateurs (2019)

Awards

Much Music Video Awards

Juno Awards

References

Canadian DJs
Mad Decent artists
Electronic dance music DJs